The first hat-trick in the Premier Soccer League was scored in 1996, and there have been over 150 hat-tricks scored since then. Pollen Ndlanya is the player with most hat-tricks, having scored six. The fastest hat-trick was scored by James Chamanga, between the 20th and 25th minute for Moroka Swallows in December 2007. Richard Henyekane is the player with most hat-tricks in a season for Golden Arrows, having scored three in 2008–09 season. Peter Shalulile is the first player with back to back hat-trick in 2021–22 season. Bonfils-Caleb Bimenyimana is the first player to score hat-trick with only penalties 2022–23 season.

Hat-tricks

Note: The results column shows the scorer's team score first

Multiple hat-tricks
The following table lists the number of hat-tricks scored by players who have scored two or more hat-tricks.

Hat-tricks by clubs

Hat-tricks by nationality
The following table lists the number of hat-tricks scored by players from a single nation.

References

Premier Soccer League
Premier Soccer League